The 1975 Ladbroke International was a professional invitational team snooker tournament, that took place in early 1975 and was recorded by Thames Television for broadcast. The event featured two teams, "England" and "Rest of the World", with representatives from each team playing single  matches. The winning team was determined by the aggregate score in points across all matches. The "Rest of the World" team won by 113 points.

The "England" team was Rex Williams, Fred Davis, Graham Miles, John Spencer and John Pulman. The "Rest of the World" team was Ray Reardon (Wales), Eddie Charlton (Australia), Cliff Thorburn (Canada) and Alex Higgins and Jackie Rea (both Northern Ireland).

Broadcasts were on ITV from 7 April 1975, with commentary by Shaw Taylor.

Results

References

1975 in snooker
1975 in English sport